Roger Eliasson is a Swedish sailor in the Dragon class. He became World Champion in 1973 together with Jerry Burman and Johan Palmqvist.

References

Swedish male sailors (sport)
Dragon class sailors
Possibly living people
Year of birth missing